Kayaönü is a Turkishplace name and it may refer to;

 Kayaönü, Adıyaman a village in Adıyaman (central) district of Adıyaman Province
Kayaönü, Palu  a village in Palu district of Elazığ Province
Kayaönü, Ermenek a village in Ermenek district of Karaman Province
Kayaönü, Mut  a village in Mut district of Mersin Province